The Kildare-Waterford line is a railway line in Ireland connecting Dublin with the major port of Waterford City in County Waterford. The line was constructed by the Great Southern and Western Railway. At Cherryville Junction, Co. Kildare the line splits from the Cork line. Both passenger and freight services run on the line. InterCity passenger services are operated by the 22000 Class DMUs.  is located on a short spur off the line; freight trains use the Lavistown loop line to avoid reversal there.

Services
Monday-Thursday
7 trains in each direction Dublin to Waterford
2 trains  to Dublin
1 train Dublin to Carlow
Friday
8 trains in each direction Dublin to Waterford 
1 train Dublin to Carlow 
2 trains Carlow to Dublin
Saturday
7 trains Dublin-Waterford
8 trains Waterford-Dublin 
Sunday
4 trains in each direction Dublin to Waterford 
The journey times range from 1h 55min to 2h 20min Dublin to Waterford and 1h 48min to 2h 16min Waterford to Dublin.

References

Railway lines in Ireland
Railway lines opened in 1844